The 2022 Stadium Super Trucks Series was the tenth season of the Stadium Super Trucks. The season began with the Grand Prix of Long Beach and concluded at Bristol Motor Speedway.

Matthew Brabham entered as the defending champion, though he only ran select races due to his commitment to Indy Lights. Gavin Harlien won his first championship.

Drivers

Schedule
Long Beach, which has hosted SST since the inaugural season in 2013, served as the season opener for the first time. Dates at Mid-Ohio Sports Car Course and the Music City Grand Prix took place in support of the IndyCar Series, while a round at Bristol Motor Speedway was added as part of Cleetus McFarland's Bristol 1000 weekend. Honda Indy Toronto was originally scheduled before being removed as Robby Gordon was away on business for his Speed UTV brand.

Season summary
The season opener at Long Beach saw the SST debuts of Ryan Arciero and Cleetus McFarland while Davey Hamilton Jr. made his return as a full-time driver after a three-year absence. The Gordon family swept the weekend as Max Gordon scored his first career win after holding off his father Robby, who won the second race after McFarland spun and hit the wall as he approached the finish.

The second round at Mid-Ohio saw the series debuts of Ben Maier and Cory Winner. Robby Gordon skipped the weekend due to overseas obligations with Speed UTV whereas Hamilton exited the series due to an injury he sustained in Long Beach. Gavin Harlien controversially won the first race after United States Auto Club officials accidentally extended the distance from 11 to 13 laps; although Robert Stout beat Harlien to the finish on the 13th lap, USAC restored the results after 11 laps and granted Harlien the victory. Harlien and Stout continued to be the top drivers in the second race, but a last-lap pass by Max Gordon enabled him to take the win.

At Nashville, Brabham won the Saturday race after holding off Harlien. While Indy Lights was also at the weekend, Brabham was able to run SST after rain forced the day's Lights activities to be canceled. Harlien returned the favor in the second race, though he was involved in a wreck with Stout and McFarland that caused the latter to flip.

The Bristol round was organized in support of McFarland's Bristol 1000, a race involving McFarland and multiple YouTubers. As a result, five of the 13 drivers racing SST were media personalities with no prior series experience: Derek Bieri of Vice Grip Garage, Matt Carriker of YouTube channel DemolitionRanch, Hyperdrive star Fielding Shredder, and the Diesel Brothers Dave Kiley and Dave Sparks. The series newcomers were scrutinized for their aggressive driving styles that impacted the full-time drivers competing for points, and Harlien's father confronted Sparks after the second race. Harlien and Stout won the round's two races.

Results and standings

Race results

Drivers' championship

Notes

References

Stadium Super Trucks